Jetmir Haliti (born 14 September 1996) is a professional footballer who plays as a centre-back for Mjällby AIF, on loan from AIK. Born in Sweden, he represents the Kosovo national team.

Club career

Early career and FC Rosengård
Haliti at the age of eight started playing football in Malmö BI, where after nine years it was transferred to BK Olympic, he besides being was part of BK Olympic, Haliti was part of Prespa Birlik for a short time until 19 March 2016, where he joined with Swedish Division 1 side FC Rosengård.

Loan at Landskrona BoIS
On 27 March 2018, Haliti joined Superettan side Landskrona BoIS, on a season-long loan. On 16 June 2018, he made his debut in a 1–2 away defeat against IK Brage after coming on as a substitute at 62nd minute in place of Bahrudin Atajić.

Jönköpings Södra IF
On 18 December 2018, Haliti signed a three-year contract with Superettan club Jönköpings Södra IF and this transfer would become legally effective in January 2019. On 2 April 2019, he made his debut in a 0–1 away defeat against Halmstad after being named in the starting line-up.

AIK
On 21 January 2021, Haliti signed a two-year contract with Allsvenskan club AIK and received squad number 6. AIK reportedly paid a 1,2 million Swedish krona transfer fee. On 10 May 2021, he made his debut in a 2–0 away defeat against Norrköping after coming on as a substitute at 70th minute in place of Ebenezer Ofori.

Loan at Mjällby AIF
On 31 March 2022, Haliti joined Allsvenskan side Mjällby AIF, on a season-long loan. Ten days later, he was named as a Mjällby AIF substitute for the first time in a league match against Djurgårdens IF.

International career
On 31 May 2021, Haliti received a call-up from Kosovo for the friendly matches against Guinea and Gambia, but due to injury, could not be part of the national team. His debut with Kosovo came on 16 November 2022 in a friendly match against Armenia after being named in the starting line-up.

Career statistics

Club

References

External links

1996 births
Living people
Footballers from Malmö
Kosovan men's footballers
Kosovo international footballers
Swedish men's footballers
Swedish people of Kosovan descent
Swedish people of Albanian descent
Association football central defenders
Division 3 (Swedish football) players
BK Olympic players
Division 2 (Swedish football) players
Ettan Fotboll players
KSF Prespa Birlik players
FC Rosengård 1917 players
Superettan players
Landskrona BoIS players
Jönköpings Södra IF players
Allsvenskan players
AIK Fotboll players
Mjällby AIF players